Vadim Vladimirovich Rifel (born February 19, 1979) is a professional hockey player from Kazakhstan. He's played internationally with the Kazakhstan men's national ice hockey team 8 times in the Ice Hockey World Championships. For the 2010-2011 season he was voted as the best player on his team by local fans. He previously played 4 seasons with EHC Freiburg in Germany.

Career statistics

External links

1979 births
Arlan Kokshetau players
EHC Freiburg players
Kazakhstani ice hockey left wingers
Kazakhstani people of German descent
Kazzinc-Torpedo players
Living people
Yertis Pavlodar players
Yuzhny Ural Orsk players
Asian Games silver medalists for Kazakhstan
Medalists at the 2003 Asian Winter Games
Medalists at the 2007 Asian Winter Games
Ice hockey players at the 2003 Asian Winter Games
Ice hockey players at the 2007 Asian Winter Games
Asian Games medalists in ice hockey
Sportspeople from Oskemen